Frink Park is a 17.2 acre (70,000 m²) park in the Leschi neighborhood of Seattle, Washington. It is a heavily wooded hillside and ravine through which flows Frink Creek. Most of the park is bounded by 31st Avenue S. in the west, 34th Avenue S. in the east, and the rights-of-way of S. Main Street in the north and S. King Street in the south. Lake Washington Boulevard S. and S. Frink Place are recreational drives within the park.

Frink Park borders Leschi Park in its northwest corner.

The land for the park was donated to the city in 1906 by parks commissioner John M. Frink.  It was listed on the National Register of Historic Places in 2019.

External links
Parks Department page on Frink Park
Friends of Frink

Parks in Seattle
National Register of Historic Places in Seattle
Parks on the National Register of Historic Places in Washington (state)